Papyrus 20 (in the Gregory-Aland numbering), designated by 𝔓20, is an early copy of the New Testament in Greek. It is a papyrus manuscript of the Epistle of James, but it only contains Chapter 2:19-3:9. The manuscript has been paleographically assigned to the early 3rd century.

Description 
The original size of the leaves was 17 by 12 cm.

The text is neatly written in upright semi-cursive letters. The main Nomina Sacra are used, but πατηρ/pater/father and ανθρωπος/anthropos/man are written out in full.

The Greek text of this codex is representative of the Alexandrian text-type (rather proto-Alexandrian). Aland placed it in Category I. This manuscript shows the greatest agreement with Codex Sinaiticus and Vaticanus, but not with codices Ephraemi, Regius and other late Alexandrian manuscripts.

Philip Comfort has conjectured that the scribe who wrote 𝔓20 was also the same scribe who wrote 𝔓27, where the Greek letters α, β, δ, ε, λ, ι, μ, ν, ο, π, ρ, σ, ψ, υ, φ, ω are formed identically in both manuscripts.

It is currently housed at the Princeton University Library (AM 4117) in Princeton.

See also
 James 2; 3
 List of New Testament papyri
 Princeton Papyri

References

Further reading 
 B. P. Grenfell & A. S. Hunt, Oxyrhynchus Papyri IX, (London 1912), pp. 9–11.

External links 

 Robert B. Waltz. NT Manuscripts: Papyri, 𝔓20 Encyclopedia of Textual Criticism
 Images of the 𝔓20 at the Princeton University Library Papyrus
 P. Oxy. 1171 at the Oxyrhynchus Online
 GA Papyrus 20. Center for the Study of New Testament Manuscripts

New Testament papyri
3rd-century biblical manuscripts
Early Greek manuscripts of the New Testament
1171
Epistle of James papyri